Kiribaru Dam  is a gravity dam located in Miyazaki Prefecture in Japan. The dam is used for irrigation. The catchment area of the dam is 4.2 km2. The dam impounds about 11  ha of land when full and can store 2040 thousand cubic meters of water. The construction of the dam was started on 1990 and completed in 2012.

See also
List of dams in Japan

References

Dams in Miyazaki Prefecture